Sacerdos is Latin for "priest". 

Sacerdos may also refer to:
Quintus Tineius Sacerdos (c. 160 – aft. 219), Roman politician
Marius Plotius Sacerdos (3rd century), Roman grammarian
Sacerdos of Limoges (670–c. 720), French saint
Sacerdos of Lyon (487–551), French saint
Sacerdos of Saguntum (died c. 560), Spanish saint
 One of the Forty Martyrs of Sebaste

See also
Sacerdote (disambiguation)
Ecce sacerdos magnus, an antiphon from the common liturgy
Sacerdotalism, belief that propitiatory sacrifices for sin require the intervention of a priest
Sarlat Cathedral, a Roman Catholic church dedicated to Sacerdos of Limoges